Gondelsheim is a village (Ortsteil) in the municipality of Weinsheim in the county of Bitburg-Prüm in the German state of Rhineland-Palatinate.

Location 
Gondelsheim lies in the valley of the Vlierbach stream, which flows past the village to the south. To the north rises the Seimersberg hill. The main roads through the village are the Kreisstrassen K 172 and  K 178. Neighbouring villages are Schwirzheim to the east, Baselt to the south and Weinsheim to the west.

History 
In 1988 scattered pieces of Roman pottery were found south of Gondelsheim dating to the 2nd and 4th centuries AD indicating that the area was already settled by that time. 

On 1 January 1971 the hitherto independent municipality of Gondelsheim was incorporated into Weinsheim.

Sights 
 Roman Catholic parish and pilgrimage church of St. Fides, built in the 15th century

Clubs 
 Freiwillige Feuerwehr Gondelsheim (volunteer fire service)
 Chorgemeinschaft Büdesheim-Gondelsheim-Schwirzheim (choir)
 Karneval Gondelsheim (carnival)

Population

References 

Bitburg-Prüm